Emeryopone is a small genus of ants in the subfamily Ponerinae. The genus is distributed in Asia, from Israel to Indonesia. Little is known about their biology, and males remain unknown.

Species
 Emeryopone buttelreepeni Forel, 1912
 Emeryopone franzi (Baroni Urbani, 1975)
 Emeryopone loebli (Baroni Urbani, 1975)
 Emeryopone melaina Xu, 1998
 Emeryopone narendrani Varghese, 2006

References

External links

Ponerinae
Ant genera
Hymenoptera of Asia